

A
Adarsha Vidyamandir High School
Adarsha Balika Vidhyalaya
Adhunik Hindi Harijan Vidyalaya
Agrasain Balika Siksha Sadan
Agrasain Boys' School
Al-Ameen Mission
Ambika Hindi Balika Vidyalaya
Andul Road Adarsha Vidyayatan
Arya Balika Vidyalaya 
Arya Banimandir Girls High School
Asian International School

B
B. E. College Model School
B. Garden Chittaranjan Adarsha Vidhyalaya
B.K. Paul Institution
Bali Chaitalpara M. F. Prah School
Bally Little Buds Educational Garden
Bally Nischinda Chittaranjan Vidyalaya
Baltikuri Muktaram Dey High School
Bamangachi Sree Arabinda High School
Bamangachi Vidyapith
Bantra B.B.P.C. Girls High School
Bantra M.S.P.C. High School
Bantra Rajlaksmi Balika Vidyalaya
Bator Sikshayatan For Girls
Belur Girls High School
Belur Hindi Vidyamandir
Belur Municipality School
Bharati Vidyalaya Senior Secondary School
Binodini Balika Vidyabhaban
Buxarah High School

C
Cambridge English School
Chamrail Balika Vidyalaya
Chengail Shree Vidyaniketan High School (H.S)
Chirantani Vidyapith
Christina English Day School
Cowley Memorial S.t. Monicas School

D
Don Bosco School Liluah
Dasnagar Chapaladevi Balika Vidhalaya
Dharsa Mihirlal Khan Institution
Dharsa Prahlad Das Balika Vidhyalaya

G
Ghusuri Balika Vidyalaya 
Goaberia High School
Gopal Krishna Shiksha Mandir
Guru Nanak Public School
Gyan Mandir Higher Secondary School
Garbalia Rakhal Chandra Manna Institution
 Ghusuri uchcha madhyamik vidyalaya high

H
Howrah Modern School
Howrah Vivekananda Institution
Heritage Academy High School
Howrah Deshbandhu Vidhyalaya
Howrah Deshbandhu Balika Vidhyalaya
Howrah Jogesh Chandra Girls High School
Howrah Janata Adarsh Vidyalaya
Howrah Rabindra Vidhyamandir
Howrah Ramkrishnapur High School
Howrah Akshay Sikshayatan
Howrah Bodhoday Academy
Howrah High School
Howrah Muslim High School
Howrah Rabindra Vidyamandir (HS)
Howrah Sikshasadan High School
Howrah St. Mark's School
Howrah Zilla School

I
Ichapur Girls High School
Ichapur High School
Imperial City School

J
Jagacha Girls High School
Jagacha High School
Jagriti Hindi vidhya Mandir
Jawahar Navodaya Vidyalaya, Howrah
 Jhikira High School
Julien Day School, Howrah

K
Kanaipur Sriguru High School
Kanduah Mahakali High School
Kendriya Vidyalaya Santragachi
Keshabpur High School
Khasmorah High School
Kolorah High School
Kona High School
Kendriya Vidyalaya Bamangachi

L
Little Star High School
Lyceum English Medium School

M
Maria's Day School
Mohiary Kundu Chaudhury Institution
Mohiary High School
Modern Day School
Motilal Jaiswal Vidyamandir
Motilal Nehru Smriti Vidyalaya
Mount Litera Zee School
MC Kejriwal Vidyapeeth

N
Napaty High School
Naskarpara Jutemill Vidyalaya
Netaji Shubhas Vidyalaya
Netaji Vidyayatan
Nischinda Balika Vidyapith

P
Padmapukur Ramkrishna Vidyalaya
 Painting School of Fine Arts, Podrah, Podrah Board Primary School, Andul Road, Near Westbank hospital, Dist. – Howrah, Pin – 711109, West Bengal, India.
 Panitras High School, Panitras, Bagnan, Howrah, Pin - 711303, West Bengal, Howrah
Pally Unnayan School
Panchanantala High School
Prasannakumary Balika Sikhasadan, Shibpur
Phanindranath High School

R
Rabindra Shiksha Sadan
Radha Gobinda Vidyamandir
Radharani Vidyamandir
Raghunathpur Nafar Academy
Ratnakar High School
Rose Bud School

S
Saint Aloysius Orphanage and Day School
Saint Dominic Savio School
Salkia A.S. High School
Salkia Adarsh Vidyalaya
Salkia Kedarnath Babulal Rajgariah Girls High School
Salkia Hindu School
Salkia Mrigendra Dutta Smriti Balika Vidyapith
Salkia Savitri Balika Vidyalaya
Salkia Vidyapith (high)
Salkia Vikram Vidyalaya
Santragachi Bhanumati Balika Vidhyalaya
Santragachi Kedarnath Institution, Howrah
Santragachi Kedarnath Institution (Girls)
Santragachi Mixed High School
Santragachi Rail Colony High School
Satashi High School
Shalimar Hindi High School
Shibpur Bengal Jute Mill High School
Shibpur Bhabani Balika Vidyalaya
Shibpur Chatterjeehat Girls High School
Shibpur Chittaranjan Adarsha Vidhyalaya
Shibpur Dinobandhu Institution
Shibpur Hindu Girls High School
Shibpur Jasodamoyee Balika Vidyalaya
Shibpur S.S.P.S Vidyalaya
Shibpur Sikshalaya
Shibpur Sri Ramkrishna Vidyalaya
Shibpur Ambika Hindi High School
Shri Baleshwar Adarsh Vidyalaya
Sonamui Fateh Singh Nahar High School
South End Centre (E.M.) High School
Sri Durga Balika Vidyalaya
Sri Ramkrishna Sikshalaya
St. Agnes’ Convent School
St. Ann's Day School
St. Denis School
St. Helen's School
St. Johns High School
St. John's Diocesan Girls' Higher Secondary School
St. Joseph Day School
St. Marks School
St. Paul's Institution
St. Thomas' Church School
St. Xavier's Public School, Bagnan, Howrah
Sudhir Memorial Institute,Liluah (Howrah) 
Surendranath Girls High School
Sunrise English Medium High School
Swami Vivekananda Convent School

T
Thanamakua Model High School
Tarasundari Balika Vidyabhaban
Tentulkuli High School (H.S.)
Town School Howrah

U
Unsani High School
Usha Martin School
Ushangini Balika Vidyalaya

V
Vivekananda Institution
 Vels Vidyashram,Howrah

References

http://www.indiacom.com/yellow-pages/schools/howrah/
http://www.westbengalschools.co.in/howrah/schools-list-1.html

Howrah
Schools in Howrah district